Ololygon hiemalis is a species of frog in the family Hylidae.
It is endemic to Brazil.
Its natural habitats are subtropical or tropical moist lowland forests, rivers, and freshwater marshes.
It is threatened by habitat loss.

References

 

hiemalis
Endemic fauna of Brazil
Amphibians described in 1987
Taxonomy articles created by Polbot